Lagophylla is a small genus of flowering plants in the family Asteraceae. The genus is native to western North America, especially California.

These are annual plants with small yellow flowers which open during the night. Thomas Nuttall describes the leaves with their "abundant, soft, white, silky hairs" as resembling the foot of a hare, and says he named the genus "from the leaves being clad with long, soft hairs."

 Species
 Lagophylla diabolensis - California (Diablo Range)
 Lagophylla dichotoma - forked hareleaf - California (San Benito, Fresno, + Monterey Cos)
 Lagophylla glandulosa - glandular hareleaf - California 
 Lagophylla minor - lesser hareleaf - northern California
 Lagophylla ramosissima - branched hareleaf - from San Diego County to Montana + Washington

References

External links
 USDA Plants Profile
 Jepson eFlora treatment
 Jepson Manual (1993) treatment
 Genus account

 
Flora of the Western United States
Asteraceae genera